Cherai is a village in Osian, Jodhpur Tehsil, Jodhpur district, Rajasthan, India.

References

Villages in Jodhpur district